The Deputy First Minister of Scotland  is the second highest ranking minister of the Government of Scotland, behind the First Minister of Scotland. The post-holder deputises for the First Minister of Scotland in period of absence or overseas visits, and will be expected to answer to the Scottish Parliament on behalf of the First Minister at First Minister's Questions.

John Swinney of the Scottish National Party (SNP) is the current Deputy First Minister of Scotland, he was appointed by First Minister Nicola Sturgeon on the 21 November 2014.

Functioning responsibilities

The post is not recognised in statute (in comparison with the post of First Minister which is established by the Scotland Act 1998), and its holder is simply an ordinary member of the Scottish Government. The post has nonetheless existed since the establishment of the Scottish Parliament and Scottish Government in 1999. When one party governs alone, the Deputy First Minister is a senior member of the governing party, typically the party's deputy leader (though at present this is not the case, as Keith Brown is the Scottish National Party depute leader). When the government is formed by a coalition, the Deputy First Minister is usually the leader of the minority partner.

The Deputy First Minister, within the Scottish Government, has direct responsibility and control over the strategy of the Scottish Government, delivery and outcomes of ministerial portfolios, resilience, as well as cross-government co-ordination of public service reform. Alongside the responsibilities of the post-holders functions as Deputy First Minister, the post holder is also required to have direct responsibility for a cabinet secretary post. The current Deputy First Minister, John Swinney, is also Cabinet Secretary for Covid Recovery.

Nomination and election

The Additional Member System used to elect Members of the Scottish Parliament makes it difficult for a single party to have an absolute majority. Between 1999 and 2007, the Scottish Executive was formed by a Labour and Liberal Democrat coalition, with the leader of Scottish Labour serving as First Minister and the leader of the Scottish Lib Dems serving as Deputy First Minister.

Although the Scottish National Party (SNP) formed a single party minority administration following the 2007 election, the post was not abolished despite there being no need to recognise the status of a second party leader, instead being given to the SNP's depute leader, Nicola Sturgeon.  When Sturgeon became First Minister, the party's depute leader, Stewart Hosie, was serving in the Parliament of the United Kingdom and did not have a seat in the Scottish Parliament.  The Deputy First Minister's post thus went to John Swinney.

List of Acting First Ministers

List of Deputy First Ministers

See also
 Under-Secretary of State for Scotland

References

Ministerial posts of the Scottish Government
 
Scotland